Post-amendment to the Tamil Nadu Entertainments Tax Act 1939 on 1 April 1958, Gross jumped to 140 per cent of Nett  Commercial Taxes Department disclosed 32 crore in entertainment tax revenue for the year.

The following is a list of films produced in the Tamil film industry in India in 1981, in alphabetical order.

Tamil Films Released in 1981

References

1981
Films, Tamil
Lists of 1981 films by country or language
1980s Tamil-language films